Sir John Smith may refer to:

John Smith (High Sheriff of Kent) (1557–1608), English politician
John Smith (banneret) (1616–1644), English Royalist soldier
Sir John Silvester Smith, 1st Baronet (1734–1789), first of the Smith-Dodsworth baronets
Any of the first three Smith baronets:
Sir John Smith, 1st Baronet (1744–1807)
Sir John Wyldbore Smith, 2nd Baronet (1770–1852), second Smith-Marriott baronet
Sir John James Smith, 3rd Baronet (1800–1862), third Smith-Marriott baronet
John Smith (British Army officer, born 1754) (1754–1837), British general
Sir John Mark Frederick Smith (1790–1874), British general
John Cyril Smith (1911–1997), English criminal legal scholar
John Smith (businessman) (1920–1995), British association football executive
Sir John Lindsay Eric Smith (1923-2007), British banker, Member of Parliament, and founder of The Landmark Trust
John Smith (police officer) (1938-), Metropolitan Police Deputy Commissioner

See also
John Smith